Perth—Wellington is a federal electoral district in southwestern Ontario, Canada, that has been represented in the House of Commons of Canada since 2004. The riding consists of:

 Perth County including the City of Stratford and the Town of St Marys, and
 the Town of Minto, the Townships of Mapleton and Wellington North in the County of Wellington.

Demographics

(Other languages, 2016: 7.8% German, 1.9% Dutch)

History
The riding was created in 2003 from parts of Perth—Middlesex (76%), Waterloo—Wellington (17%) and Dufferin—Peel—Wellington—Grey (7%) ridings. It did not undergo any boundary changes in the 2012 electoral redistribution.

Members of Parliament

Election results

See also
 List of Canadian federal electoral districts
 Past Canadian electoral districts

References

External links

Riding history from the Library of Parliament
 2011 results from Elections Canada
 Campaign expense data from Elections Canada

Ontario federal electoral districts
Stratford, Ontario